Greensville Correctional Center is a prison facility located in unincorporated Greensville County, Virginia, near Jarratt. The prison, on a  plot of land, is operated by the Virginia Department of Corrections. Greensville houses the execution chamber that was used to carry out capital punishment by the Commonwealth of Virginia until the death penalty in Virginia was abolished in 2021.

History

Opened in September 1990 in a ceremony presided over by Governor of Virginia L. Douglas Wilder, the $106 million facility was built to provide initial relief to the then overcrowded Virginia correctional system. The facility opening allowed for the subsequent closure of the Virginia State Penitentiary in downtown Richmond. The execution chamber moved from the former state penitentiary to Greensville in 1991.

Initially, the center was classified as a maximum security facility. However, with the subsequent opening of other facilities intended for the most hardened violent criminals, the security classification at Greensville has been lowered to close security.

The facility consists of 4 pod-style buildings (three have a capacity for 516 inmates each; the fourth can handle 192 higher-risk inmates) arranged in a hexagon in a  campus-like setting. The tract of land upon which the Correctional Center is constructed measures .  It is located one mile (1.6 km) from Interstate 95. The primary contractor for the project was Morrison-Knudsen.

In 1995, a minimum-security work camp for low-risk inmates was constructed adjacent to the main complex.  Together, the two facilities have a capacity of 3,007 inmates.

The facility contains a dedicated health care unit and mental health center which serves inmates in the eastern region of the Virginia corrections system. It is also home to the state death chamber, which was completed in April 1991.  There have been 111 executions by electrocution or lethal injection that have taken place in the L Building, located at the rear of the facility.

Notable executions at Greensville Correctional Center
Albert Jay Clozza – raped and murdered a teenage girl; executed on July 24, 1991, the first person executed at Greensville Correctional Center.
Roger Keith Coleman – convicted murderer and rapist who claimed innocence before his May 20, 1992 execution. DNA evidence later confirmed his guilt.
Syvasky Lafayette Poyner – spree killer; executed on March 18, 1993.
Timothy Wilson Spencer – serial killer known as the Southside Strangler; executed on April 27, 1994.
Dawud Majid Mu'Min – raped, robbed, and murdered a woman while in a prison work crew; executed on November 13, 1997.
Angel Francisco Breard – raped and murdered a woman; executed on April 14, 1998, despite international pressure since Breard was a Paraguayan national.
Mir Aimal Kansi – perpetrator of the 1993 CIA headquarters shootings; executed on November 14, 2002.
Brandon Wayne Hedrick - convicted of the abduction, rape, and murder of Lisa Yvonne Crider, executed on July 20, 2006.
Earl Conrad Bramblett – mass murderer; executed on April 9, 2003.
John Allen Muhammad – serial killer and spree killer known as the Beltway Sniper for the Beltway Sniper Attacks; executed on November 10, 2009.
Paul Warner Powell – raped and murdered a teenage girl; executed on March 18, 2010.
Teresa Wilson Bean Lewis – executed on September 23, 2010, the only woman executed by Virginia via lethal injection.
Robert Charles Gleason Jr. – serial killer executed on January 16, 2013, the last person executed by Virginia via electric chair.
Alfredo Rolando Prieto – serial killer; executed on October 1, 2015.
Ricky Javon Gray – serial killer, spree killer, and mass murderer; executed on January 18, 2017.
William Charles Morva – spree killer; executed on July 6, 2017, the last person executed by Virginia.

See also

Capital punishment in Virginia
List of Virginia state prisons

References

External links
Greensville Correctional Center / Greensville Work Center at the Virginia Department of Corrections

Prisons in Virginia
Buildings and structures in Greensville County, Virginia
Capital punishment in Virginia
1990 establishments in Virginia
Execution sites in the United States